Milwaukee Country Day School (MCD) was a country day school in Whitefish Bay, Wisconsin, United States. It operated under the headmastership of A. Gledden Santer. The school was begun in 1917, "incorporated by leading citizens.". According to alumnus Henry Reuss,  "Country Day, with its Church of England prayers, its 'body sports' and its Latin studies, marked the general de-Germanization of Milwaukee culture which occurred in the 1920s."

In 1964 it merged with two other local day schools (Milwaukee University School and Milwaukee-Downer Seminary) to become the University School of Milwaukee. MCD's facilities became the South Campus, which operated until it closed in 1985. It is now the home of the Milwaukee Jewish Day School and the Harry & Rose Samson Family Jewish Community Center.

The school appears in the novel Shadowland by alumnus Peter Straub.

Notable alumni 
William Kasik, Republican member of the Wisconsin State Assembly
Fred Miller, president of the Miller Brewing Company
John R. Meyer (legislator), Republican member of the Wisconsin State Assembly
Henry Reuss, Democratic member of Congress
James Sensenbrenner, Republican member of Congress
Brooks Stevens, industrial design pioneer
Peter Straub, horror novelist

Further reading 
Stark, William F. "Be A Great Boy": The Story of Milwaukee Country Day School 1917-1963. Milwaukee Country Day School Alumni Association, circa 1963

References 

Educational institutions established in 1917
Educational institutions disestablished in 1964
Education in Milwaukee
Defunct schools in Wisconsin
1917 establishments in Wisconsin

External links
History of Milwaukee Country Day School, Wisconsin Historical Society website

See also Country Day School movement